The Polish exclusive economic zone (Polish EEZ) has the area of 30,533 km2. within the Baltic Sea.

It includes the following bathymetric basins: Bornholm Basin (part, max. depth 95 m within Polish EEZ), Slupsk Furrow (complete, max. depth 93 m), Gotland Basin (part, max. depth 120 m within Polish EEZ ), and Gdansk Basin (part, max. depth 107 m within Polish EEZ). There are a number of shoals between the basins and the Polish coast, including Odra Bank (min.
depth 4.5 m), Slupsk Bank (min. depth 8 m), Stilo Bank (min. depth 18 m) and Southern Middle Bank (min. depth 14 m).

Of mineral resources within the Polish EEZ, best recognized are gravel and sand deposits.

History
Poland has a regulated economic zone with Sweden and Russia. In the case of Russia, the agreement was signed by the then-existing Union of Soviet Socialist Republics, but is recognized as Russia is the legal successor of the Soviet Union.

Poland also had a regulated economic zone with East Germany since 1989. After the reunification of Germany, the new German state recognizes the previous arrangements only as regards the state border, but does not recognize the arrangements with East Germany as regards the exclusive economic zone.

Since the 1980s, the issue of the demarcation of economic zones between Poland and Denmark remained unresolved: the dispute concerned the body of water to the south-east of Bornholm. The Polish state should apply here the provision of the Act on maritime areas of the Republic of Poland, which states that the Council of Ministers may - in the absence of international agreements - define the boundary of the exclusive economic zone by regulation. Since no such act was issued, the regulation of the Council of Ministers (of May 26, 1978) was applied in practice, defining the external borders of the Polish sea fishing zone. However, this zone is not recognized by neighboring countries. The border between the Polish and Danish EEZ was established in November 2018.

See also 
 Exclusive economic zone of Germany
 Exclusive economic zone of Russia

References

Economy of Poland
Poland
Baltic Sea
Fishing in Poland
Borders of Poland